Uncial 0140 (in the Gregory-Aland numbering), is a Greek uncial manuscript of the New Testament, dated paleographically to the 10th century.

Description 

The codex contains a small part of the Acts of the Apostles 5:34-38, on one parchment leaf (14.5 cm by 12 cm). It is written in one column per page, 18 lines per page, in uncial letters. 

The Greek text of this codex is a representative of the mixed text-type. Aland placed it in Category III. 

Currently it is dated by the INTF to the 10th century.

The codex now is located in Saint Catherine's Monastery (Sinai Harris App. 41).

See also 
 List of New Testament uncials
 Biblical manuscript
 Textual criticism

References

Further reading 

 Agnes Smith Lewis, Catalogue of the Syriac MSS. in the Convent of S. Catharine on Mount Sinai. Studia Sinaitica I (London, 1894), p. 116. 

Greek New Testament uncials
10th-century biblical manuscripts